News 24 is the first Albanian 24-hour news television channel founded in 2002 in Tirana, Albania, by Italian journalist and former shareholder of Gazeta Shqiptare newspaper, Radio Rash, and Balkanweb portal, Carlo Bollino. The channel's format resembles its Italian equivalent Rai News24. News is updated every minute.

News 24 operates the popular news portal Balkanweb. It was established in February 2000 by the Italian publishing company Edisud (e.g. La Gazzetta del Mezzogiorno) funded with a contribution from the Soros Foundation and then sold to Focus Group in 2011. Balkanweb's videos come almost exclusively from 'News 24'.

Nationally created shows

References

See also
Television in Albania

Television networks in Albania
24-hour television news channels
Albanian news websites